Viktor Musiyaka (28 June 1946 – 22 July 2019) was a Ukrainian politician, leader of the party "Forward, Ukraine!", and deputy chairman of the Ukrainian parliament.

Musiyaka was born soon after World War II in a family of a farmer in a small village between Mykolaiv and Ochakiv. Soon after graduating high school, he worked on factories, first at the Shipyard named after 61 Communards and then after returning from the army at the Olshansky Cement Factory near the town of Olshanske. In 1973 Musiyaka graduated the Kharkiv Law University and its aspirantura, after which he was teaching at the university. Occasionally Musiyaka headed several departments at the university and in 1992 he was granted the title of professor.

From 1994 to 2006 Musiyaka was active in politics of Ukraine and twice was elected to the Ukrainian parliament where for sometime he served as a deputy chairman of the Verkhovna Rada.

External links
 Viktor Musiyaka at the Logos Ukraine website
 Viktor Musiyaka at the Pavlo Hai-Nyzhnyk personal website
 Profile at the Official Ukraine Today
 Interview of Viktor Musiyaka by the Ukraina Moloda

1946 births
2019 deaths
People from Mykolaiv Oblast
20th-century Ukrainian lawyers
21st-century Ukrainian lawyers
People's Self-Defense Political Party politicians
Yaroslav Mudryi National Law University alumni
Academic staff of Yaroslav Mudryi National Law University
Academic staff of the National University of Kyiv-Mohyla Academy
Second convocation members of the Verkhovna Rada
Fourth convocation members of the Verkhovna Rada
Deputy chairmen of the Verkhovna Rada